The 1982 SWAC men's basketball tournament was held March 4–6, 1982. The quarterfinal round was held at the home arena of the higher-seeded team, while the semifinal and championship rounds were held at the Mississippi Coliseum in Jackson, Mississippi.  defeated , 87–77 in the championship game. The Braves received the conference's automatic bid to the 1982 NCAA tournament as No. 11 seed in the Midwest Region.

Bracket and results

References

1981–82 Southwestern Athletic Conference men's basketball season
SWAC men's basketball tournament